Barkatullah (also spelt as Barakatullah or Barkat Ullah) was a Christian apologist and a convert from Islam. He was baptised at the age of 16 years on 7 July 1907.  He worked as a lecturer in Edwardes College, and Forman Christian College from 1914 until his ordination in 1923. He also served in the Henry Martyn School of Islamic Studies in Aligarh after his retirement in 1956. He has authored several Urdu volumes in his contribution to the Christian apologetics. He was also the member of the Royal Asiatic Society. He died in 1971.

References 

1891 births
1971 deaths
People from Narowal District
Converts to Protestantism from Shia Islam
Converts to Anglicanism from Islam
Academic staff of the Forman Christian College
Christian apologists
Indian former Muslims
Indian Christian writers